Alessandro Tomasi (born 18 September 1979 in Pistoia) is an Italian politician.

He was a member of right-wing parties National Alliance and The People of Freedom and he served as municipal councillor in Pistoia from 2007 to 2017. He joined Brothers of Italy and ran for Mayor of Pistoia at the 2017 Italian local elections, supported by a centre-right coalition formed by Brothers of Italy, Forza Italia, Lega Nord and the civic list "Pistoia Concreta". He was elected on 25 June 2017 and took office on 26 June.

See also
2017 Italian local elections
List of mayors of Pistoia

References

External links
 
 

1979 births
Living people
Mayors of Pistoia